Dorstone railway station was a station in Dorstone, Herefordshire, England. The station was opened in 1881, closed to passengers in 1941 and closed completely in 1953.

References

Further reading

Disused railway stations in Herefordshire
Railway stations in Great Britain opened in 1881
Railway stations in Great Britain closed in 1953
Former Great Western Railway stations